The Tomb of the Unknown Soldier is a war memorial located in the Ukrainian capital of Kyiv, dedicated to the soldiers of the Red Army killed in the Second World War. It is situated at the Memorial of Eternal Glory inside the Park of Eternal Glory. The memorial is a 27 meters high obelisk, with an eternal flame burning at the tomb. The Alley of Heroes leads to the tomb.

Overview
The tomb was opened on 6 November 1957, on the eve of the ruby jubilee of the October Revolution. On 8 May 1967, it was dedicated to the memory of all the unknown Ukrainian soldiers who gave their lives in the Liberation of Ukraine. International dignitaries such as U.S. President Richard Nixon, Azerbaijani President Ilham Aliyev, Lithuanian Prime Minister Algirdas Butkevičius, Russian President Vladimir Putin, and Turkish Prime Minister Recep Tayyip Erdogan have visited and laid wreaths at the tomb. It is official protocol by the State Protocol Department of the Ministry of Foreign Affairs for dignitaries on state visits to lay wreaths at the Tomb of the Unknown Soldier. The British government has annually held Remembrance Day services at the tomb.

Since Ukrainian decommunization laws came into effect in 2015, the monument has become a divisive symbol between the pro-Russian population and the nationalist population.

Gallery

See also
 Tomb of the Unknown Soldier (Moscow)
 Victory Square (Minsk)
 Eternity Memorial Complex, Chișinău

References

Soviet military memorials and cemeteries in Ukraine
Monuments and memorials built in the Soviet Union
Buildings and structures completed in 1957
Tombs of Unknown Soldiers
Monuments and memorials in Kyiv